Landiwah is a town and union council in Lakki Marwat District of Khyber-Pakhtunkhwa. It is located at 32°44'52N 70°57'57E and has an altitude of 303 metres (997 feet).

References

Union councils of Lakki Marwat District
Populated places in Lakki Marwat District